Pacman (stylized PACMAN or PacMan) is an exploit that takes advantage of a hardware bug in the  speculative execution function of the Apple M1 processors which was made public on June 10, 2022 by MIT security researchers. The flaw is in a hardware security feature called pointer authentication codes (PAC) and is believed to be intrinsic to the platform and unable to be patched. The M1 was the first ARM desktop CPU to implement pointer authentication. Apple stated that they did not believe the vulnerability posed a serious danger to users because it requires specific conditions to be exploited. An exploit would involve a combination of memory corruption and speculative execution.

See also
Side-channel attack

References

External links
 

Speculative execution security vulnerabilities
Hardware bugs
2022 in computing
Side-channel attacks